Mihael Pongračić (born 24 August 1993) is a Croatian football midfielder, currently playing for NK Dračice Đakovo.

External links
 

Mihael Pongračić at Sportnet.hr 

1993 births
Living people
Sportspeople from Đakovo
Association football midfielders
Croatian footballers
Croatia youth international footballers
NK Osijek players
NK Belišće players
HNK Šibenik players
Croatian Football League players
First Football League (Croatia) players